Clube de Esportes União ABC, commonly known as União ABC, is a Brazilian football club based in Campo Grande, Mato Grosso do Sul state.

Stadium
União ABC play their home games at Estádio das Moreninhas. The stadium has a maximum capacity of 4,500 people.

References

External links
 União ABC on Facebook

Association football clubs established in 1998
União ABC
1998 establishments in Brazil